Nootropics (  or  ) (colloquial: brain supplements, smart drugs and cognitive enhancers) are numerous natural, semi-synthetic and synthetic molecules that improve cognitive functions (such as executive functions, attention, memory, creativity).

They are often found in the form of dietary supplements, nutraceuticals and energy drinks. Some nootropic molecules can also be found as prescription and non-prescription pharmaceutical drugs in diverse countries.

History and definition

The term nootropic is derived .

Marketing claims

Nootropics are often advertised with unproven claims of effectiveness for improving cognition. Manufacturers' marketing claims for dietary supplements are usually not formally tested and verified by independent entities. The US Food and Drug Administration (FDA) and Federal Trade Commission (FTC) warned manufacturers and consumers in 2019 about possible advertising fraud and marketing scams concerning nootropic supplement products. The FDA and FTC stated that some nootropic products had not been approved as a drug effective for any medical purpose, were not proven to be safe, and were illegally marketed in the United States under violation of the Federal Food, Drug, and Cosmetic Act.

In 2018 in the United States, some nootropic supplements were identified as having misleading ingredients and illegal marketing. In 2019, the FDA and FTC warned manufacturers and consumers about possible advertising fraud and marketing scams concerning nootropic supplements.

Over the years 2010 to 2019, the FDA warned numerous supplement manufacturers about the illegal status of their products as unapproved drugs with no proven safety or efficacy at the doses listed on the products, together with misleading marketing.

Availability and prevalence 
In 2008, the most commonly used class of drug was stimulants, such as caffeine. In 2016, the American Medical Association adopted a policy to discourage prescriptions of nootropics for healthy people, on the basis that the cognitive effects appear to be highly variable among individuals, are dose-dependent, and limited or modest at best. More recently piracetam, noopept and meclofenoxate have been sold as dietary supplements.

Side effects
The main concern with pharmaceutical drugs and dietary supplements are adverse effects. Long-term safety evidence is typically unavailable for many nootropic compounds. Racetams, piracetam and other compounds that are structurally related to piracetam, have few serious adverse effects and low toxicity, but there is little evidence that they enhance cognition in people having no cognitive impairments.

In the United States, dietary supplements may be marketed if the manufacturer can show that the supplement is generally recognized as safe, and if the manufacturer does not make any claims about using the supplement to treat or prevent any disease or condition; supplements that contain drugs or advertise health claims are illegal under US law.

Types

Central nervous system stimulants  

Systematic reviews and meta-analyses of clinical human research using low doses of certain central nervous system stimulants found that these drugs enhance cognition in healthy people. In particular, the classes of stimulants that demonstrate cognition-enhancing effects in humans act as direct agonists or indirect agonists of dopamine receptor D1, adrenoceptor A2, or both receptors in the prefrontal cortex. Relatively high doses of stimulants cause cognitive deficits.
 Amphetamine systematic reviews and meta-analyses report that low-dose amphetamine improves cognitive functions (e.g., inhibitory control, episodic memory, working memory, and aspects of attention) in healthy people and in individuals with ADHD. A 2014 systematic review noted that low doses of amphetamine also improve memory consolidation, in turn leading to improved recall of information in non-ADHD youth. It also improves task saliency (motivation to perform a task) and performance on tedious tasks that required a high degree of effort.
 Caffeine a meta-analysis found an increase in alertness and attentional performance.
 Eugeroics (armodafinil and modafinil) are classified as "wakefulness-promoting agents"; modafinil increases alertness, particularly in sleep-deprived individuals, and facilitates reasoning and problem solving in non-ADHD youth. In a systematic review of small, preliminary studies where the effects of modafinil were examined, when simple psychometric assessments were considered, modafinil intake enhanced executive function. Modafinil may not produce improvements in mood or motivation in sleep deprived or non-sleep deprived individuals.
 Methylphenidate a benzylpiperidine derivative that improves working memory, episodic memory, and inhibitory control, aspects of attention, and planning latency in healthy people. It also may improve task saliency and performance on tedious tasks. At above optimal doses, methylphenidate has off–target effects that decrease learning.
 Nicotine a meta-analysis of 41 clinical studies concluded that nicotine administration or smoking improves alerting and orienting attention and episodic and working memory and slightly improves fine motor performance.

Amino acids

A 2016 review reported that theanine may increase alpha waves in the brain. Alpha waves may contribute to a relaxed yet alert mental state. A 2014 systematic review and meta-analysis found that concurrent caffeine and -theanine use had synergistic psychoactive effects that promoted alertness, attention, and task switching. These effects were most pronounced during the first hour post-dose.

Racetams

Racetams, such as piracetam, oxiracetam, phenylpiracetam, and aniracetam, are often marketed as cognitive enhancers and sold over the counter. A 2019 study found that piracetam supplements sold in the United States were inaccurately labeled. Racetams are often referred to as nootropics, but this property is not well established. The racetams have poorly understood mechanisms, although piracetam and aniracetam are known to act as positive allosteric modulators of AMPA receptors and appear to modulate cholinergic systems.

According to the FDA,

Piracetam is not a vitamin, mineral, amino acid, herb or other botanical, or dietary substance for use by humans to supplement the diet by increasing the total dietary intake. Further, piracetam is not a concentrate, metabolite, constituent, extract or combination of any such dietary ingredient. [...] Accordingly, these products are drugs, under section 201(g)(1)(C) of the Act, 21 U.S.C. § 321(g)(1)(C), because they are not foods and they are intended to affect the structure or any function of the body. Moreover, these products are new drugs as defined by section 201(p) of the Act, 21 U.S.C. § 321(p), because they are not generally recognized as safe and effective for use under the conditions prescribed, recommended, or suggested in their labeling.

Cholinergics

Some of the most widely used nootropic substances are the cholinergics. These are typically compounds and analogues of choline. Choline is an essential nutrient needed for the synthesis of acetylcholine (a neurotransmitter), and phosphatidylcholine (a structural component of brain cell membranes).
 Alpha-GPC – L-Alpha glycerylphosphorylcholine has thus far only been studied in the context of cognitive performance alongside other substances such as caffeine. A more comprehensive meta-analysis is needed before any strong conclusions are made about Alpha-GPC's usefulness as a nootropic.
 Choline bitartrate – Choline bitartrate is a tartaric acid salt containing choline (41% choline by molecular weight). At least one meta-analysis has found choline bitartrate to be ineffective at improving any measure of cognitive performance.
 Citicoline – Compound consisting of choline and cytidine. Several meta-analyses found that it is likely effective for improving memory and learning in older people with mild cognitive decline, as well as in people who are recovering from a stroke. There is little evidence it enhances cognition in young, healthy people.

Miscellaneous
 Atomoxetine may improve working memory and attention when used at certain doses.
 Desipramine may improve working memory and attention when used at certain doses.
 ISRIB enhanced spatial and fear-associated learning.
 Levodopa a systematic review noted that it improved verbal episodic memory and episodic memory encoding. and is sold as M pruriens dietary supplements in the US.
 Nicergoline may improve human cognitive performance, including concentration, psychomotor performance, attention, reaction times, and other indicators of brain function.
 Tolcapone a systematic review noted that it improved verbal episodic memory and episodic memory encoding.

The cognitive enhancing effects of pramipexole, guanfacine, clonidine, and fexofenadine have been tested, but no significant cognition-enhancing effects in healthy individuals were found.

Psychedelic microdosing is the novel practice of using sub-threshold doses (microdoses) of psychedelic drugs in an attempt to improve mood and cognition. The efficacy of this has not been verified. In a study examining the qualitative reports of 278 microdosers the researchers found that there were mixed results among users. While some users reported positive effects such as improved mood and cognition, others paradoxically reported negative effects such as physiological discomfort and anxiety. In one of the only double-blind, randomized studies to date, those given microdoses of LSD did not perform better than those given the placebo on cognitive tasks.

Herbs
 Bacopa monnieri is used in Ayurvedic traditional medicine to improve cognition. In 2019, the US Food and Drug Administration (FDA) warned manufacturers of dietary supplement products containing Bacopa monnieri against making illegal and unproven claims that the herb can treat various diseases.
 Centella asiatica A 2017 meta-analysis with 11 studies (5 RCTs with placebo, 6 using other herbs as a comparison group) showing no significant improvement in all cognitive function, however may have some use in improving mood and anger. Overall dosages were smaller than the typical 3 grams used traditionally.
 Ginkgo biloba An extract of Ginkgo biloba leaf is marketed in dietary supplement form with claims it can enhance cognitive function in people without known cognitive problems, although there is no high-quality evidence to support such effects on memory or attention in healthy people.
 Panax ginseng A review by the Cochrane Collaboration found that the results of its analysis "suggested improvement of some aspects of cognitive function, behavior and quality of life" but concluded that "there is a lack of convincing evidence to show a cognitive enhancing effect of Panax ginseng in healthy participants and no high quality evidence about its efficacy in patients with dementia."
 Salvia officinalis and lavandulaefolia (sage) Some research has suggested certain extracts of Salvia officinalis may have positive effects on human brain function, but due to significant methodological problems, no firm conclusions can be drawn. The thujone present in Salvia extracts may be neurotoxic.

Nutrients and dietary supplements

A 2015 review found that use of omega-3 fatty acids, B vitamins, and vitamin E as nootropics was ineffective on cognitive function in normal middle-aged and older people.
 Folate no cognition-enhancing effects in middle-aged and older adults without folate deficiency.
 Omega-3 fatty acids: DHA and EPA two Cochrane Collaboration reviews on the use of supplemental omega-3 fatty acids for ADHD and learning disorders conclude that there is limited evidence of treatment benefits for either disorder. Two other systematic reviews found no cognition-enhancing effects in the general population.
 Vitamin B12 no cognition-enhancing effects in middle-aged and older adults without B12 deficiency.
 Vitamin B6 no cognition-enhancing effects in middle-aged and older adults without B6 deficiency.
 Vitamin E no cognition-enhancing effects in middle-aged and older adults without vitamin E deficiency.

See also 

 Cognitive science
 Evidence-based learning
 Flowers for Algernon, a novel on the subject of enhancing intelligence
 Human enhancement
 List of drugs used by militaries
 
 
 Neuroenhancement
 Neuropharmacology
 Neuroplastic effects of pollution
 Neuropsychopharmacology
 Nutritional neuroscience
 Psychoactive drug

References

External links 
 

 
1970s neologisms
Amphetamine
Methylphenidate